Northern Cypriot passports are issued to citizens of the self-declared state of Northern Cyprus (TRNC) for the purpose of international travel. 

The passport is valid in only a few countries in the world due to the limited international recognition of Northern Cyprus. A Northern Cypriot passport is valid in Anguilla, Pakistan, Tanzania, Turkey, Australia, the United Kingdom and the United States. Turkish Cypriots are also issued with Turkish passports.

Until 1994 entry to the United Kingdom was easier on an "unrecognised" TRNC passport than a Turkish passport. Many Kurds whom some were aligned with the outlawed PKK, and political dissidents paid high prices to obtain TRNC passports which they used to enter the UK visa-free and claim asylum.

See also
 Cypriot passport
 Northern Cypriot identity card
 Visa requirements for Northern Cypriot citizens
 Foreign relations of Northern Cyprus
 List of diplomatic missions of Northern Cyprus
 List of diplomatic missions in Northern Cyprus
 Passports in Europe

References

External links

Cypriot, Northern
Foreign relations of Northern Cyprus
Law of Northern Cyprus